Perry was Perry Como's 22nd album released by RCA Records.

Track listing
Side One
"Temptation" (Music by Nacio Herb Brown, lyrics by Arthur Freed)
"The Hands of Time"  (Music by Michel Legrand, lyrics by Marilyn and Alan Bergman)
"You Are the Sunshine of My Life" (Stevie Wonder)
"Behind Closed Doors" (Kenny O'Dell)
"I Don't Know What He Told You" (Lyrics by Robert I. Allen)
       
Side Two
"That's You" (Juan Carlos Calderón)
"The Way We Were" (Music by Marvin Hamlisch, lyrics by Marilyn and Alan Bergman)
"The Most Beautiful Girl" (Rory Bourke, Billy Sherrill and Norro Wilson)
"Beyond Tomorrow" (Mikis Theodorakis and Larry Kusik) 
"Weave Me the Sunshine" (Peter Yarrow)

References

External links
Perry Como Discography

Perry Como albums
1974 albums
RCA Records albums